Choerophryne is a genus of microhylid frogs, commonly known as Torricelli mountain frogs, endemic to New Guinea. These frogs are small, with the body length measured from snout to vent between 11 and 23 mm.

Taxonomy and systematics
The distinction between Choerophryne and the former genus Albericus was based solely on the orientation of the alary processes of the premaxillae, giving the former its distinctive snout. In 2013 a new Choerophryne species was described with an orientation intermediate between the two genera, suggesting Albericus is likely a junior synonym of Choerophryne. Formal synonymisation of the two genera was suggested by Peloso and colleagues in 2016 based on molecular evidence.

Etymology
The genus name of the junior synonym Albericus is the Latin form of Alberich, the shape-shifting dwarf in the epic poem Nibelungenlied. Several species derive also their specific names from Nibelungenlied, e.g. C. siegfriedi from Siegfried and C. fafniri from Fafnir.

Species
Amphibian Species of the World assigns 37 species to Choerophryne, including the species previously assigned to the genus Albericus:

References

 
Microhylidae
Amphibian genera
Amphibians of New Guinea
Endemic fauna of New Guinea
Taxa named by Pieter Nicolaas van Kampen